Steven Johnson (born 6 September 1974) is an Australian racing driver. He is the son of former racer and now team-owner Dick Johnson. He competed full-time for Dick Johnson Racing from 2000–2012. Johnson is married and has two children.

Johnson's best season result was in 2001, where he led the championship for two rounds and took two round wins, including the Canberra round win, where he recorded victory from pole position in the first race, before finishing the rest of the races in the top five. Near season's end, he dropped to fifth, still his best ever effort. Then came a period he would rather forget, finishing the 2002 and 2003 seasons well outside the top ten. He improved to tenth in the 2004 season. He was looking for a top five in 2005, but had a poor Bathurst 1000 to place him outside the top ten.

In 2007, Johnson recorded his best Bathurst 1000 result with a podium finish in third after leading late in the drama-charged closing laps as intermittent rain swept across the Mountain in an entertaining scrap with Craig Lowndes, James Courtney and Greg Murphy.

In early 2013, it was announced that Steven Johnson would step down from competing in the V8 Supercars championship and instead become general manager of Dick Johnson Racing. He currently competes in the Touring Car Masters. In the endurance events in the 2013 season, Johnson teamed up with Erebus Motorsport, as a co-driver in car No. 9 SP Tools Racing's Maro Engel.

Career results

Complete Touring Car Masters Championship results
(key) (Races in bold indicate pole position) (Races in italics indicate fastest lap)

Bathurst 1000 results

References

External links

Biography at V8 Supercars
Dick Johnson Racing website

1974 births
Australian Touring Car Championship drivers
Formula Holden drivers
Living people
Racing drivers from Brisbane
Sportsmen from Queensland
Supercars Championship drivers
Matt Stone Racing drivers
Dick Johnson Racing drivers